Albert Harold "Abe" Poffenroth (November 26, 1917 – May 1, 1997) was an American football and baseball coach. He served as the head football coach at his alma mater, Eastern Washington, from 1947 to 1952 and at Central Washington University from 1955 to 1960, compiling career college football coaching record of 58–40–3. Poffenroth was also the head baseball coach at Eastern Washington from 1950 to 1953, tallying a mark of 41–54. He was a four-year letter winner in football as a running back at Eastern Washington University from 1936 to 1939.

Head coaching record

Football

References

1917 births
1997 deaths
American football running backs
Central Washington Wildcats football coaches
Eastern Washington Eagles baseball coaches
Eastern Washington Eagles football coaches
Eastern Washington Eagles football players